Wang Shilong (born 7 March 2001) is a Chinese footballer currently playing as a right-back for Guangzhou.

Club career
Wang Shilong was promoted to the senior team of Guangzhou Evergrande within the 2020 Chinese Super League season and would make his debut in a league game on 30 August 2020 against Shanghai Shenhua in a 4-1 victory.

Career statistics

References

External links

2001 births
Living people
Chinese footballers
Chinese expatriate footballers
Association football defenders
Chinese Super League players
Guangzhou F.C. players
CF Rayo Majadahonda players
Chinese expatriate sportspeople in Spain
Expatriate footballers in Spain